The Charlie Hall House is a historic house at 221 Old United States Route 65 in Twin Groves, Arkansas.  It is a single story masonry structure, built out of fieldstone with concrete and cream-colored brick trim.  Its roofline has an irregular assortment of gables, with a front-facing gable featuring a chimney at its center.  Built about 1938, it is the first known area house completed by Silas Owen, Sr., a local master mason.  The coursing and layout of its stonework are one of Owens' highest quality works.

The house was listed on the National Register of Historic Places in 2005.

See also
National Register of Historic Places listings in Faulkner County, Arkansas

References

Houses on the National Register of Historic Places in Arkansas
Houses completed in 1938
Houses in Faulkner County, Arkansas
National Register of Historic Places in Faulkner County, Arkansas